Goodbye Youth (Italian: Addio giovinezza!) is a 1927 Italian silent drama film directed by Augusto Genina and starring Walter Slezak, Elena Sangro and Carmen Boni. The film was adapted from the 1911 play of the same name by Nino Oxilia and Sandro Camasio.

The film is set in Turin at the beginning of the Twentieth century, where a student  begins a romance with a seamstress Dorina. However, he is lured away by a sophisticated older woman leaving Dorina distressed. Genina had previously directed an earlier version of the play in 1918. It was remade as a sound film of the same title in 1940.

Cast
 Carmen Boni as Dorina  
 Walter Slezak
 Elena Sangro
 Augusto Bandini  
 Carla Bartheel
 Gemma De Ferrari

References

Bibliography
 Goble, Alan. The Complete Index to Literary Sources in Film. Walter de Gruyter, 1999.

External links
 

1927 films
1920s historical drama films
Italian silent feature films
Italian historical drama films
Films set in Turin
Italian films based on plays
1920s Italian-language films
Films directed by Augusto Genina
Remakes of Italian films
Italian black-and-white films
1927 drama films
Silent drama films
1920s Italian films